James Alexander Pond (1846–1941) was a New Zealand analytical chemist and homoeopathic pharmacist. He was born in London, England, in 1846. He is the Son of Frances Sophia Beacon

References

1846 births
1941 deaths
People in health professions from London
New Zealand chemists
New Zealand homeopaths
British emigrants to New Zealand